They Were Three Hundred (Italian: Eran trecento)  is a 1952 Italian historical drama film directed by Gian Paolo Callegari and starring Rossano Brazzi, Franca Marzi and Myriam Bru.  It was shot at the Scalera Studios in Rome with location shooting on the Via Tiburtina. The film's sets were designed by the art director Virgilio Marchi.

Cast
Rossano Brazzi as Volpintesta
Franca Marzi as Sina
Myriam Bru as  Lucia
 Paola Barbara as Sabina, la governante
Antonio Cifariello as  Sgt. Cafiero
Luisa Rivelli as  Maria Antonia
Roberto Mauri as  Orsaja
 Peter Trent as Franco della Spina
Franco Fabrizi as  Carlo Pisacane
Marco Guglielmi as  Alfiere
Armando Guarnieri as  General Della Spina 
Franco Pesce as  Beppe
 Fiorella Ferrero as 	Purificata
 Maria Belfadel as 	Suor Adelaide

References

Bibliography
 Di Fiore, Gigi. Controstoria dell'unità d'Italia. Rizzoli,2011.

External links
 

1952 films
1950s historical films
Italian historical films
1950s Italian-language films
Films set in 1857
Films scored by Giovanni Fusco
Italian black-and-white films
1950s Italian films
Films shot at Scalera Studios